Jose Antonio Pineda is a Salvadoran poet, actor and author. In interviews Pineda reflects that he was a co-founder of the Straight Theatre in Haight Ashbury in San Francisco in the 1960s.

Pineda sings mostly rhythm and blues tunes in various bands in South East Asia mostly with 'the beatniks' as Frisco Tony & the Beatniks. Neo-beat poet Pineda sometimes combines poetry reading and performance as a blues singer, specializing in American roots music.

Youth

Pineda was born in El Salvador, his parents emigrated to the United States. His father drove trucks, his mother, a teacher in El Salvador did menial jobs because of lack of language skills. His family, two sisters and two brothers lived in an Hispanic neighborhood.

He attended a local Jesuit school, but was dismissed from it in his final year saying later that 'Jesuits and the Beat poets did not have a symbiotic relationship' further saying later that, 'I defected to the Beat movement.' In those days in San Francisco, the Straight Theatre in the Haight area was a central meeting point for artist types, and Pineda acted in small plays, did some Flamenco dancing and was part of the ‘psychedelic scene’. 'My roots are in alternative culture, in particular the psychedelic underground'.

Pineda moved to Spain and Madrid in the 1970s to study dance saying later that he 'rediscovered symbolism and surrealism' during that period. Eventually moving back to the U.S., he later resided in Southeast Asia, writing, acting and giving readings of his poetry.

Novelist, writer

The novel The Magick Papers by Antonio Pineda was published in 2004.

Actor, films
Pineda had a role in the movie Teddy Bear, in which he shared scenes with one of the lead actors. Pineda was cast in the film Clash of the Empires, filmed in Cambodia and appeared in the movie as "King Korm" with fellow actor Christopher Judge.

In the film (The King Maker) David Winters 'cast me as Don Vincente dancing to the music of Bach and Vivaldi.'

The IMDb (The Internet Movie Database) credits Pineda with performances in their filmography, (3 titles) the 2011 production of Dark Bridge playing Dr. Marquez, 2010 The Lazarus Papers where he played a bar patron and 2005 The King Maker, playing Don Vincenti 

British musician Simon Whetham performed in June 2012 at Meta House in Phnom Penh creating a site-specific work. Whetham was joined by 'beat poet, author and spoken word artist' Antonio Pineda.

External links
The Magick Papers: A Novel 

The Beat the Hip & the Dead 

Salvadoran poets
Salvadoran novelists
Salvadoran actors
Male poets
Male novelists
21st-century novelists
21st-century male actors
Salvadoran male film actors
21st-century poets
Salvadoran male writers
Living people
21st-century male writers
21st-century Salvadoran writers
Year of birth missing (living people)